Lacinius is a genus of harvestmen in the family Phalangiidae.

Species
 Lacinius angulifer (Simon, 1878)
 Lacinius bidens (Simon, 1880)
 Lacinius carpenteri Roewer, 1953
 Lacinius carpetanus Rambla, 1959
 Lacinius dentiger (C.L.Koch, 1848)
 Lacinius ephippiatus (C.L.Koch, 1835)
 Lacinius erinaceus Starega, 1966
 Lacinius horridus (Panzer, 1794)
 Lacinius insularis Roewer, 1923
 Lacinius longisetus (Thorell, 1876)
 Lacinius magnus Rambla, 1960
 Lacinius ohioensis (Weed, 1889)
 Lacinius regisalexandri Kratochvíl, 1936
 Lacinius ruentalis Kraus, 1961
 Lacinius texanus Banks, 1893
 Lacinius zavalensis Hadzi, 1973

References

Harvestmen
Harvestman genera